{{DISPLAYTITLE:C7H7NO}}
The molecular formula C7H7NO (molar mass: 121.14 g/mol, exact mass: 121.0528 u) may refer to:

 2-Acetylpyridine
 2-Aminobenzaldehyde
 Benzamide
 Formanilide

Molecular formulas